RSAM may refer to:
Régiment de Soutien Aéromobile, French Regiment
Random Sequential Access Method, version of storage access method
Real-time Seismic-Amplitude Measurement